Ozon is one of the first e-commerce companies in Russia, sometimes referred to as "the Amazon of Russia." Established in 1998 as an online bookstore, Ozon was one of the three biggest online retail platforms in the country by 2019. It was named as the #3 most valuable Russian internet company of 2020 by Forbes.

Ozon is part of Ozon Group, which also owns the online travel booking platform Ozon. Travel and a stake in Russia's largest digital bookstore Litres. The current chief executive officer of Ozon is Alexander Shulgin, who joined the company after serving as chief financial officer and later chief operating officer of Yandex.

In October 2020 it was reported that Ozon plans to hold an IPO in the United States that could value the company at $3-5 billion. In November 2020, Ozon went public on the Nasdaq in an IPO that valued the company at $6.2 billion.

History 
Ozon.ru was established in 1998 as an online bookseller by the Russian software house Reksoft. The company soon expanded its assortment to CDs and DVDs before going on to sell a wide range of goods from clothing to electronics. In 2012, it acquired the shoe seller Sapato.ru and sold it in 2015 to the online fashion retailer KupiVIP. In 2014, it acquired a stake in Litres, a major Russia's e-book marketplace.

Leadership 
After a series of Russian chief executive officers, in 2005 Ozon appointed Bernard Lukey, who had advised the company on behalf of Baring Vostok. In 2011 Maelle Gavet became the new chief executive officer of Ozon. During her tenure, the firm worked to popularize e-commerce in the mainly cash-based Russian retail market. Gavet stepped down as chief executive officer in 2015; her deputy Danny Perekalsky was appointed successor. Since 2017 the chief executive officer of has been Alexander Shulgin, the former chief financial officer and chief operating officer of the Russian tech company Yandex. In April 2022, Mr. Shulgin bowed out as CEO and member of the board of directors of Ozon due to international sanctions during the Russo-Ukrainian War.

Funding 
In 1999, ru-Net Holdings, founded by Leonid Boguslavsky along with the Western Baring Vostok Group, UFG and Rex Capital, purchased a controlling stake in the company for $3 million. In 2000, Baring Vostok became a controlling shareholder after investing $3 million into the company. In 2007, Ozon raised $18 million in a funding round led by the Geneva-based Index Ventures. In 2011, Ozon attracted $100 million in investment from Japanese e-commerce company Rakuten, Boguslavsky's ru-Net and others, followed by another $150 million funding deal with the Russian conglomerate Sistema and the Russian mobile operator MTS in 2014. MTS and Baring Vostok invested another $92 million into Ozon in 2018. In 2019, Boguslavsky sold his share in Ozon to the company's main shareholders, Baring Vostok and Sistema, for $70 million.

In 2019 Ozon secured a $150 million round of financing with the participation of U.S. venture capital firm Princeville Capital, in what was reported to be one of the largest Russian tech investment deals involving Western backers since 2014.

Financial performance 
Ozon reported a "hypergrowth" stage in 2019 as sales for the year increased by 93% to $1.1 billion and the volume of orders more than doubled to 32.2 million. Company turnover by gross merchandise volume (GMV) grew 188% year on year in the second quarter of 2020 and reached RUB 77.4 billion by H12020, an increase of 152% from the same period in the previous year. According to Daniil Fedorov, Ozon's chief financial officer at the time, the coronavirus pandemic created a new habit of shopping online among Russian consumers.

2022 fire at the Istra (Moscow) fulfilment centre 
On August 3rd 2022 a large fire destroyed approx 50,000SQM of warehouse (Approx 1/3rd of the building) including the contents of the building the external walls and roof. At least one person died and 13 were injured in the fire. The emergencies ministry initially said the fire had spread to an area of 35,000 square metres but later revised this to approx 50,000SQM. A fire-pumping station, an Mi-8 helicopter, two Ka-32 helicopters, 150 firefighters and 40 other pieces of equipment were deployed to the scene, it said.

Products and services 
Ozon offers more than 9 million products across more than 20 product categories including clothing, groceries, home goods and electronics. After a large increase in the available assortment, the volume of orders more than doubled in 2019 to 32.2 million.

In early 2019, the company launched a service called Ozon.Invest that grants loans to small and medium-sized businesses that sell their products on the Ozon marketplace. Ozon was also the first online retailer in Russia to launch consumer loans for multi-category online purchases, as well as its own debit card with a cashback feature.

Ozon has been operating a marketplace platform for third-party sellers since 2018. In June 2020, the marketplace had more than 13,000 sellers who accounted for more than 85% of the assortment on the site.

In November 2021 “Ozon” announced the opening of pilot pickup mini-points, at least 15 square meters each, in small Russian towns from the beginning of 2022.

In August 2022, Ozon announced the launch of an ad service for the sale of goods from individuals. The pilot region was the Rostov region.

Supply chain and delivery 
Ozon developed its own fulfillment infrastructure to deliver orders in Russia's 11 time zones. In 2018 the company had seven fulfillment centers in the Moscow region as well as St. Petersburg, Tver, Kazan, Ekaterinburg, Rostov-On-Don and Novosibirsk. It more than doubled its fulfilment capacity in 2019 to almost 200,000 sqm, as well as investing in its last-mile delivery infrastructure.

The company operates its own delivery logistics platform and has a network of over 16,000 pickup points, including automated parcel lockers across Russia, . The use of brick-and-mortar pickup points where customers can pick up their orders arose out of a lack of reliable third-party delivery services in many parts of Russia. In 2019, Ozon launched an express grocery delivery service in Moscow, and rolled out its contactless home delivery service, which became a popular option during the coronavirus pandemic in the spring of 2020.

In March 2020, Ozon announced plans to spend more than $300 million to expand its logistics in advance of a potential IPO.

In October 2021, “Ozon Express” brand launched in Moscow inhouse ready-to-serve food production with one hour delivery with up to 30 dishes by the end of 2021. “Ozon Express” culinary production is expected to be available in other regions of Russia.

In December 2021, "Ozon" announced to be ready to launch by the end of the year 2021 the 15-minutes delivery of groceries and pre-prepared food in 30 districts of Moscow by virtue of company`s darkstores.

COVID-19 pandemic 
Ozon reported record sales growth during the coronavirus pandemic, as quarantine measures in Russia drove more people to shop online. During the crisis, the company capped prices on the most sought-after goods to prevent price gouging by marketplace sellers and expanded its contactless home delivery service to limit the spread of infection. In July 2020, Ozon and four other Russian retailers commissioned a monument to delivery workers who continued to work during lockdown in Moscow.

References 

Technology companies of Russia
1998 establishments in Russia
E-commerce in Russia
Companies listed on the Nasdaq